City Group is one of the largest Bangladeshi conglomerates. It began on 6 February 1972 as a mustard oil company venture under the name City Oil Mills. The first project of City Oil Mills turned out to be very successful. After then, the company grew very quickly. It presently owns more than 25 major concerns located throughout Bangladesh. Now, City Group stands as one of top ten business houses in Bangladesh.

History 
City Group was established by Fazlur Rahman, a business magnate in the private sector of Bangladesh. City Group began on 6 February 1972 as a mustard oil company venture. After its first successful project, City Group invested in new fields, including manufacturing, industry and trading. More enterprises were established in the early 1990s; these included consumer goods, foods, steel, printing & packaging, shipping, power and energy, shares and securities, insurance, media, and healthcare.

On 4 October 2017, the Government of Bangladesh approved the export of 57,273 tones of Sugar by Deshbandhu Group and City Group.

City Hi-Tech Park 
City Group is planning to build a Hi-Tech Park in Demra, Dhaka which will be biggest Hi-Tech park developed by a private company. Total investment target is 50 Billion BDT and expecting to create 15,000 jobs. The park to be built in on 115 acres of land area in Demra.

The park will be used to manufacture technology products such as microprocessors, chips, circuits, mobile phones and laptops. The investors of the park will get government facilities fast and also one stop service from the authority.

Controversy 
On 14 July 2022, a Chattogram court issued an arrest warrant for City Group Chairman Fazlur Rahman, in a case filed by the Bangladesh Standards and Testing Institution (BSTI)  for not maintaining standard Vitamin A levels in soybean and palm oils.

Prior to that, on October 20, 2019, BSTI inspector Rajiv Dasgupta filed a case as the group’s “Teer” oil failed to pass the "Vitamin-A" test in BSTI lab. In the case statement, the allegation was brought against Fazlur Rahman saying that he violated the government order and act by not following edibles oil fortification with Vitamin A  Act-2013.

List of companies
City Group now operates over 25 major concerns:
 City Oil Mills
 City Re-rolling Mills
 City Vegetable Oil Mills Ltd.
 City Fibers Ltd.
 Hasan Plastic Industries Ltd.
 Hasan Flour Mills Ltd.
 Hasan Printing & Packaging Ltd.
 Hasan Containers Ltd.
 City Navigations Ltd.
 City PET Industries Ltd.
 Shampa Oil Mills Ltd.
 City Dal Mills Ltd.
 Farzana Oil Refineries Ltd.
 VOTT Oil Refineries Ltd.
 City Feed Products Ltd.
 Deepa Food Products Ltd.
 City Seed Crushing Industries Ltd.
 City Salt Industries Ltd.
 City Sugar Industries Ltd.
 C.S.I Power & Energy Ltd.
 Rahman Synthetics Ltd.
 Hamida Plastic Industries Ltd.
 Shampa Flour Mills Ltd.
 Hasan Securities Ltd.
 City Bran Oil Ltd.
 Dhaka Insurance Ltd.
 Somoy Media Ltd.
 Asgar Ali Hospital Ltd.
 Speech Bubble Communications Ltd.
 New Sagurnal Tea Co. Ltd. Juri, Moulovibazar.
 Nahar Tea Estate, Sreemongal, Moulovibazar.
 Chandpur Belgaon Tea estate, Banskhali, Chittagram.
 Rupshi Flour Mills Ltd
 City Edible Oil Ltd

See also
 List of companies of Bangladesh

References

Conglomerate companies established in 1972
Conglomerate companies of Bangladesh
Bangladeshi companies established in 1972